is a city located in Nagano Prefecture, Japan. , the city had an estimated population of 20,118 in 7372 households, and a population density of 99 persons per km2. It markets itself as "Japan's Hometown" and is known as the "Little Kyoto of Snow Country".

Geography
Iiyama is located in the mountainous far northern portion of Nagano Prefecture, and is bordered by Niigata Prefecture to the north. The area is known for severe winters with heavy snowfall. The Chikuma River (the longest river in Japan) runs through the centre of the area and becomes known as the Shinano River when it passes into Niigata Prefecture.

Surrounding municipalities
Nagano Prefecture
 Nakano
 Kijimadaira
 Nozawaonsen
 Shinano
 Sakae
Niigata Prefecture
 Jōetsu
 Myōkō

Climate
The city has a climate characterized by characterized by hot and humid summers, and relatively mild winters (Köppen climate classification Dfa). All of the city is considered part of the snow country of Japan, with heavy accumulations of snow in winter.

History
The area of present-day Iiyama was part of ancient Shinano Province. The area was part of the holdings of Iiyama Domain during the Edo period, and the core of the city was the jōkamachi surrounding Iiyama Castle, held by a cadet branch of the Honda clan. The modern town of Iiyama was established within Shimominochi District, Nagano with the establishment of the municipalities system on April 1, 1889. It was raised to city status on August 1, 1954 by the merger of the town of Iiyama with neighboring villages of Akitsu, Tokiwa, Yanagihara, Tozama, Kijima and Zuiho. The villages of Ōta and Okayama were also annexed in 1955.

Demographics
Per Japanese census data, the population of Iiyama has declined over the past 70 years.

Government
Iiyama has a mayor-council form of government with a directly elected mayor and a unicameral city legislature of 16 members.

Economy
The economy of Iiyama is primarily agricultural with emphasis on rice, asparagus, mushrooms and potatoes. Manufacturing includes production of Butsudan, skis and electronics. Seasonal tourism to ski resorts and hot springs also make a major contribution.

The TV and electronics manufacturer Iiyama was founded in the city in 1972, although, after a series of mergers, the company is no longer headquartered there. The old office continues to be used as a manufacturing centre for Iiyama's parent company, Mouse Computer.

Education
Iiyama has seven public elementary schools and two public middle schools operated by the city government. The city has one public high school operated by the Nagano Prefectural Board of Education.

Transportation

Railway
 East Japan Railway Company -  Hokuriku Shinkansen
  
 East Japan Railway Company - Iiyama Line
 –  –  –  –  –  –  –  –

Highway
 Jōshin-etsu Expressway

International relations
 – Futian District, Shenzhen, China – friendship city since July 10, 2014.

Local attractions
There are many well known ski resorts in the area. These include Nozawa Onsen Snow Resort, Madarao Sympathique (now closed), Madarao Kogen, Tangram Ski Circus, Togari Onsen, and Hokuryuko 
The  is a Designated Cultural Landscape of Japan.
Iiyama also hosts a number of popular festivals such as the Iiyama Snow Festival and Kamakura Snow Hut Festival in February and Iiyama Dontokoi in August.
The Shinetsu Trail, that runs through Iiyama along the border between Nagano prefecture and Niigata prefecture, is a popular hiking spot in summer.
In February 2015, Guinness World Records confirmed that the city had officially broken the record for 'most snowmen built in an hour.'

Notable people from Iiyama
Naoki Inose – author and former Tokyo governor

References

External links

Official Website 

 
Cities in Nagano Prefecture
Cultural Landscapes of Japan